Q School 2020 – Event 1 was the first of three qualifying tournaments for the 2020-21 snooker season. It took place from 3 to 7 August 2020 at the English Institute of Sport in Sheffield, England.

Format 
The tournament consisted of players being randomly assigned to four sections. Each section plays in the knockout system with the winner of each section earning a two-year tour card to play on the main tour for the 2020–21 snooker season and 2021–22 snooker season. Round 1 and 2 matches were the best of 5 frames, whereas subsequent matches were the best of 7.

Main Draw

Section 1 
Round 1

Section 2 
Round 1

Section 3 
Round 1

Section 4 
Round 1

References 

Snooker competitions in England
Q School (snooker)
2020 in snooker